A nucleotide kinase is any kinase taking a nucleotide reactant. It may mean:

 Nucleoside-phosphate kinase, EC 2.7.4.4
 Nucleoside-diphosphate kinase, EC 2.7.4.6
 (deoxy)nucleoside-phosphate kinase, EC 2.7.4.10
 Nucleoside-triphosphate—adenylate kinase, EC 2.7.4.13
 Cytidylate kinase, EC 2.7.4.14